
This is a list of aircraft in numerical order of manufacturer followed by alphabetical order beginning with 'Mx'.

Mx

MX Aircraft 
 MX Aircraft MX2
 MX Aircraft MXS
 MX Aircraft MXR

References

Further reading

External links 

 List Of Aircraft (M)

fr:Liste des aéronefs (I-M)